Goliath is an inverted roller coaster located at Six Flags Fiesta Texas in San Antonio, Texas, United States. Designed by Werner Stengel and Swiss manufacturer Bolliger & Mabillard, Goliath initially opened in 1995 at an amusement park in Japan, and has been operating at Six Flags Fiesta Texas since 2008.

History

Goliath originally opened in 1995 as Gambit at Odakyu Gotemba Family Land, a former amusement park in Japan that was later known as Thrill Valley. When Thrill Valley closed on May 6, 2002, Six Flags purchased several of its rides, including Gambit, and transported them to various Six Flags parks. Gambit went to one of their newly acquired theme parks, Six Flags New Orleans. It was repainted and renamed Batman: The Ride in accordance with the park chain's use of DC Comics theming and reopened on April 12, 2003.

After Hurricane Katrina made landfall over New Orleans in 2005, the park's drainage system failed, leading to substantial flooding that submerged many of the park's rides in water and damaging them beyond repair. Batman: The Ride survived relatively unscathed primarily due to its high elevation above sea level and corrosion-resistant support structure. When flooding retreated, Six Flags New Orleans was permanently closed, and any rides that could be salvaged were moved to other parts of the country. Batman: The Ride was moved to Six Flags Fiesta Texas in San Antonio and would be refurbished and repainted. The coaster reopened on April 18, 2008 renamed as Goliath.

Ride experience

After departing from the station, the train immediately climbs the  chain lift hill. After exiting the loop, the train enters a zero-g roll inversion before entering a second vertical loop. This is followed by an upward right-handed helix and a downward left turn into a series of corkscrews separate by a sharp left turn. The train then veers right into a brake run and returns to the station. One cycle of the ride lasts approximately 2 minutes.

Track
As Gambit at Thrill Valley, the ride featured a painted black spine and black crossties, unpainted rails and grey supports. When it was known as Batman: The Ride in New Orleans, the track was painted black and orange with grey supports. At Six Flags Fiesta Texas, the ride has a blue track with yellow supports. Friction brakes are used to control the speed of the train. The track was manufactured by Clermont Steel Fabricators located in Batavia, Ohio.

Goliath is a clone of Bolliger & Mabillard's Batman model. The original was introduced in 1992 and became a huge success after multiple parks introduced it to their lineup. Today, the Batman model can be found all over the world. Goliath differs from other models as it is a mirror image. It is not the only Batman model to be found in San Antonio; SeaWorld introduced The Great White first in 1997.

Trains
Goliath operates two steel and fiberglass trains with seven cars each. Each car seats four riders in a single row for a total of 28 riders per train. The supports for the seats are orange, the seats themselves are black with yellow over-the-shoulder restraints connected to each one, and the coverings for the wheels are orange, blue, and yellow.

References

External links

Official website for Goliath

Roller coasters in Texas
Six Flags Fiesta Texas
Roller coasters operated by Six Flags
Steel roller coasters
Inverted roller coasters
Roller coasters introduced in 2008
Inverted roller coasters manufactured by Bolliger & Mabillard